The 1902 Florida Agricultural College football team represented the Florida Agricultural College in the sport of American football during the 1902 college football season. This was not the modern Florida Gators of the University of Florida in Gainesville, which begins in 1906, but one of its four predecessor institutions.

Schedule

References

Florida
Florida Agricultural College football seasons
Florida Agricultural College football